FIAN can stand for:

 Food First Information and Action Network, an international organisation;
 FIAN, a common abbreviation for the Lebedev Physical Institute in Moscow.
 Fian, small warrior bands in Irish and Scottish mythology (pl   Fianna )